Choré is a district of the San Pedro Department, Paraguay. It has a population of 35,950 based on 2002 
Census .